Coleen A. Hoey is an American diplomat who served as the Chargé d'Affaires to Honduras from August 2019. She is expected to be replaced by Laura Farnsworth Dogu.

Education 
Hoey has a Bachelor’s Degree in Political Science from Santa Clara University and a Master’s Degree in Government from Georgetown University. She also has a Master’s Degree in National Security and Resource Management from the Dwight D. Eisenhower School for National Security and Resource Strategy.

Political career 
In 2019, Hoey met with President Juan Orlando Hernández. She seeks to strengthen Honduras–United States relations by fighting drug trafficking.

References 

Living people
21st-century American diplomats
American women ambassadors
Ambassadors of the United States
Ambassadors of the United States to Honduras
Year of birth missing (living people)
Santa Clara University alumni
Georgetown University alumni
Dwight D. Eisenhower School for National Security and Resource Strategy alumni
21st-century American women